Qin Kai (born January 31, 1986) is a Chinese athlete who competes in diving. He competed for Team China at the 2008 Summer Olympics in Beijing, the 2012 Summer Olympics in London, and the 2016 Summer Olympics in Rio.

Career

At the 2001 World Junior Championships, he won the gold on the 3m Springboard and the silver medal on the Platform. At the 2006 National Championships, he won the silver medal on the springboard. At the 2006 World Cup, he won the gold on the 3m springboard. At the 2007 World Championships, he won the gold on the springboard and in the synchro springboard. At the 2008 World Cup, he won the gold in the 3m Synchro Springboard.

He is the 2008 Olympic Champion on the 3m Synchronized Springboard, with Wang Feng, and won bronze in the Men's 3m Springboard.

In 2009, he again won the 3m Synchronized Springboard with Wang Feng at the World Championships in Rome.  He also won the individual gold at the 1m Springboard at the same championships.

At the 2012 Summer Olympics, he again competed in the men's 3 m synchronised springboard and the men's individual 3 m springboard. He retained his synchronised springboard title, this time with Luo Yutong, and won the silver medal in the individual event.

In 2013, he won gold with He Chong at the men's 3m synchro springboard World Championships in Barcelona.

In 2015, he partnered with Cao Yuan on the men's 3m synchro springboard at the World Championships in Kazan and won gold.

At the 2016 Summer Olympics, Qin won bronze in 3m synchronized dive with Cao Yuan. He retired from international competition after the Olympics.

Personal life
Qin Kai proposed to fellow diver and girlfriend of 6 years, He Zi, right after she won silver in the women's 3m individual springboard at the Rio Olympics. They married in June 2017, and their daughter was born in October 2017.

Accolades
In 2011, Qin was named Top Ten Athlete of Shanxi province. In 2012, he was awarded the May 1st Labour Medal in the People's Republic of China.

References

External links
 Beijing 2008 Profile
 FINA profile

1986 births
Living people
Sportspeople from Xi'an
Chinese male divers
Olympic divers of China
Olympic medalists in diving
Divers at the 2008 Summer Olympics
Divers at the 2012 Summer Olympics
Divers at the 2016 Summer Olympics
Olympic gold medalists for China
Olympic silver medalists for China
2016 Olympic bronze medalists for China
Medalists at the 2012 Summer Olympics
Medalists at the 2008 Summer Olympics
World Aquatics Championships medalists in diving
Asian Games gold medalists for China
Asian Games silver medalists for China
Asian Games medalists in diving
Divers at the 2010 Asian Games
Divers at the 2006 Asian Games
Medalists at the 2006 Asian Games
Medalists at the 2010 Asian Games
Universiade medalists in diving
Universiade gold medalists for China
Medalists at the 2011 Summer Universiade
20th-century Chinese people
21st-century Chinese people